Miss Europe 1969 was the 32nd edition of the Miss Europe pageant and the 21st edition under the Mondial Events Organization. It was held at the Rabat Hilton Hotel in Rabat, Morocco on 18 May 1969. Saša Zajc of Yugoslavia, was crowned Miss Europe 1969 by Paquita Torres Pérez of Spain, Miss Europe 1967. Leena Marketta Brusiin of Finland was originally supposed to crown the winner at the end of the event, but could attend the pageant due to a car accident that happened before the pageant.

Results

Placements
 {| class="wikitable"
! Final results
! Contestant
|-
| Miss Europe 1969
|
 Yugoslavia - Saša Zajc
|-
| 1st runner-up
|
 Denmark - Jeanne Perfeldt
|-
| 2nd runner-up
|
 Germany - Elke Hein
|-
| 3rd runner-up
|
 Finland - Harriet Marita Eriksson
|-
| 4th runner-up
|
 Spain - María Amparo Rodrigo Lorenzo
|-
| 5th runner-up
|
 Sweden - Ulla Adsten
|-
| 6th runner-up
| Norway - Patricia "Pia" Ingrid Walker
|}

 Contestants  - UNKNOWN - Maud Alin - Jarmila Teplanová - Jeanne Perfeldt - Marie Smith - Harriet Marita Eriksson - Suzanne Angly - Elke Hein - Irini (Eirini) Lorandou - Olga Westmaas - María Baldursdóttir - June MacMahon - Zaira Fabbri - Jacqueline Schaeffer - Natalie Quintana - Patricia "Pia" Ingrid Walker - María Amparo Rodrigo Lorenzo - Ulla Adsten - Liselotte Pauli - Nurac Yetkin - Saša ZajcNotes
Replacements - Eva Rueber-Staier''' - Patrice Sollner

References

External links 
 

Miss Europe
1969 beauty pageants
1969 in Morocco